The Buzan is a river in the Astrakhan Oblast of Russia. From there it flows generally south-east, splitting into several smaller named distributaries near Lebyazhye.

The East Slavic Buzhan tribe inhabited the area of the Buzan river. The Buzhans are one of various Slavic tribes which formed the modern Russian people.

The Volga Delta was subject to territorial disputes between the Nogai Horde and the Russian-annexed Astrakhan Khanate in the 1550s. Negotiations between Ismael Beg and Ivan IV established the Buzan as the boundary between the two realms but proceeded to push the horde back further out of the fertile delta region. The counter-clockwise extremity of the modern Kazakhstan–Russia border reflects this history, largely following the leftmost corridors of the delta.

References

Rivers of Astrakhan Oblast
0Buzan